Brian Jamieson may refer to:
Brian Jamieson (rower), American rower
Brian Jamieson (director), director from New Zealand

See also
Jamieson (surname)